James Frederick Kaiser (Dec. 10, 1929 – Feb. 13, 2020) was an American electrical engineer noted for his contributions in signal processing. He was an IEEE Fellow and received many honors and awards, including the IEEE Centennial Medal, the IEEE W.R.G. Baker Award, the Bell Laboratories Distinguished Technical Staff Award, and the IEEE Jack S. Kilby Signal Processing Medal.

Biography
Kaiser was born in Piqua, Ohio, and earned his electrical engineering degree from the University of Cincinnati in 1952. He then moved to the Massachusetts Institute of Technology and received his masters and doctorate degrees in 1954 and 1959, respectively. 

Following his doctorate, he received a three-year appointment as an assistant professor at MIT but decided to take a leave of absence to work at Bell Labs. Although the arrangement was due to only last for a year, he enjoyed the work so much that he elected to stay. While at Bell Labs, he worked on a variety of projects in signal processing for human speech and hearing, later focusing his attention on filter design for digital signals. 

During the Bell System breakup in 1984, Kaiser moved to Bellcore. After he retired from Bellcore, he served as a visiting professor at Duke University and Rutgers University.

Kaiser died at age 90 in February, 2020, after a brief illness.

References

2020 deaths
University of Cincinnati alumni
Massachusetts Institute of Technology alumni
Scientists at Bell Labs
American electrical engineers
People from Piqua, Ohio
IEEE Centennial Medal laureates
Fellow Members of the IEEE
1929 births
Engineers from Ohio